Nothing to Gain is the third and most recent full-length studio album by San Francisco Bay Area thrash metal band Vio-lence. The album was recorded in August 1990 but was not released until 1993, and is the last to feature guitarist Robb Flynn (who had left the band to form Machine Head by the time of its release) and bassist Deen Dell. This was also their last work as a band to contain new material for 29 years, until the release of Let the World Burn in March 2022. Nothing to Gain was re-released in 1997 with a different cover.

There were two additional songs recorded during the album's sessions ("All Good Dies" and "Put Them In"), which did not make the final album and which still remain unreleased.

Track listing

Credits
Sean Killian – vocals
Phil Demmel – lead guitar
Robb Flynn – rhythm guitar
Dean Dell – bass
Perry Strickland – drums

References

1990 albums
Vio-lence albums